Carlos Patricio Díaz (born July 21, 1970) is a Chilean-born Canadian film and television actor who appears in Rent-a-Goalie, The Dead Zone and The Line. Díaz and the cast of Rent-a-Goalie were nominated for a Gemini Award in 2007, 2008 and 2009 in Seasons 1 through 3 for "Best Ensemble Performance in a Comedy Program or Series".

Filmography
 Rosie's Rules (2022–present) (TV series) - Papa
 Johnny Test (2021-present) (TV series) - Pow-ool
 Hero Elementary (2020–present) (TV series) - Mr. Sparks
 Total Drama Presents: The Ridonculous Race (2015) (TV series) - Lorenzo/Rock (15 episodes)
 Fargo (2014) (TV series) - Young Stavros (1 episode)
 Cra$h & Burn (formerly "Lawyers, Guns and Money") (2009) (TV series) - Carlos Galindo (12 episodes)
 Max & Ruby - Mr Estevez
 The Adventures of Leo & Cleo (2010) (TV series) - (voice)- Fresco (16 episodes)
 Saw 3D (2010) - Coroner Worker
 The Bridge (2009) (TV series) - parts dealer (1 episode)
 How To Be Indie (2009) (TV series) - Sensei Jeff (1 episode)
 Lawyers, Guns & Money (2008) (TV Pilot) - Carlos (pilot)
 Clean (2008) (TV Pilot) - Carl (pilot)
 The Lines  (2007–2008) - Mike (5 episodes)
 Rent-a-Goalie (2006–2008) (TV series) - Looch (26 episodes)
 Otro lado del pasillo, El (2006) (Best Short film—MethodFest)- Miguel
 The Very Good Adventures of Yam Roll in Happy Kingdom (2006) (TV series) (voice)- Ebi (unknown episodes)
 Four Brothers (2005) - baffled cop
 Cool Money (2005) (TV) - bank officer
 Hu$tle (2004) (TV) - Mike Bertollini
 Evel Knievel (2004) (TV) - DJ Caruso
 The Dead Zone (2004) (TV series) - Rick Fanuli (1 episode)
 Franny's Feet (2003-2010) (TV series) - Johnny (4 episodes)
 Crime Spree (2003) - Hector
 Adventure Inc. (2003) (TV series) - parts dealer (1 episode)
 Street Time (2002) (TV series) - Tony Rodriguez (1 episode)
 Lucky Day (2002) (TV) - Officer Miller
 John Q (2002) - Paramedic #1
 The Save-Ums! (2003) (TV series) (voice) - Raymundo the ant (8 episodes)
 Boss of Bosses (2001) (TV) - Philip Castellano
 Chasing Cain (2001) (TV)- Neil
 Hangman (2001) - Officer Peros
 RoboCop: Prime Directives (2000) (TV mini-series) - Jenkins OCPThe Uncles (2000) - Eddie the Waiter
 The Seventh Portal (2000) (TV series) - Oxblood/Roberto Diaz (voice)
 The Avengers: United They Stand'' (1999) (TV series) - Tiger Shark (voice)

External links
 

1970 births
Living people
Canadian male film actors
Canadian male television actors
Canadian male voice actors
Chilean emigrants to Canada
Canadian people of Chilean descent
Male actors from Santiago